Thymaya Payne is a director and producer, best known for his highly regarded documentary film Stolen Seas, an in-depth exploration of Somali piracy.

Biography

He is the son of Kathleen Frazer and Lewis Payne. His mother Kathleen was a child advocate and local feminist politician in Kingston New York. His father Lewis Payne was a China expert and consultant. Thymaya's name means "your illusion" in Sanskrit.

Thymaya spent much of his childhood traveling back and forth between Asia, New York City and upstate New York. In an attempt to escape the instability of his childhood he graduated from high school early and attended the University of Chicago at sixteen. His father had died when he was thirteen with complications related to HIV/AIDS and his mother died when he was eighteen of cancer.

After college Thymaya started an art collective and published art and fashion zines while living in NY, Berlin and Paris. In 2004 he continued on to graduate school at the American Film Institute. Since film school he has become an award-winning documentary and narrative filmmaker. Alongside his filmmaking, Thymaya continues his writing practice and is the author of various short stories and novellas, including "Cardamon" and "C7", written while living in Mexico City.

Thymaya currently lives and works in Venice California.

Film career

In 2008 he began a four-year journey to direct and produce an in-depth documentary about Somali piracy and its root causes called Stolen Seas. The film premiered at the Locarno Film Festival and was awarded the Boccolino' D'oro. Later, at the Palm Springs Film Festival, Stolen Seas won the John Schlesinger award for best documentary. "A dangerous 90-minute immersion in a world where lawlessness applies to all sides," said Variety. The New York Times called the Stolen Seas "magnificent". Stolen Seas was theatrically released in early 2013.

In 2015, Thymaya co-wrote and produced the independent film Live Cargo directed by Logan Sandler, starring Lakeith Stanfield and Dree Hemingway. Live Cargo premiered in competition at the 2016 Tribeca Film Festival and international at the Warsaw Film Festival among others and had its theatrical debut in spring 2017.

He was also an associate producer on several independent films including Justin Kelly's, King Cobra (2016) starring James Franco and Christian Slater.

Thymaya also co-wrote a short film called Across Our Lands, directed by Fiona Godivier, which premiered at the Cannes Film Festival in 2017.

References

American film directors
American film producers
University of Chicago alumni
Living people
Year of birth missing (living people)